Crime City is a South Korean crime action film series, starring  Ma Dong-seok in the lead role. Each film follows the story of Detective Ma Seok-do (played by Ma Dong-seok) hunting down vicious criminals. The first film The Outlaws directed by Kang Yoon-sung, starring Yoon Kye-sang as the antagonist was released in 2017. The second film titled The Roundup, directed by Lee Sang-yong and Son Suk-ku playing the antagonist was released in 2022. The production of the third film titled The Roundup: No Way Out, directed by Lee Sang-yong, is currently in progress.

Overview

Films

The Outlaws (2017) 

Detective Ma Seok-do and his team tries to catch a notorious crime lord named Jang Chen, from Harbin, China who is willing to commit crimes for money and comes to Garibong-dong to collect debts. 

With 6.87 million admissions and a gross of US$51.8 million, the film becae the 5th highest-grossing domestic film of the year in South Korea and the third best-selling R-rated Korean film of all time.

The Roundup (2022) 

Ma Seok-do and his team arrive at Ho Chi Minh City, Vietnam to interrogate a suspect, but later learns about Kang Hae-sang, a vicious killer, who has been committing crimes against Korean tourists for several years and decide to hunt him down. 

The Roundup is directed by Lee Sang-yong who served as an assistant director in the first film. Unlike the previous film which was rated for "restricted screening" by KMRB, The Roundup was rated for "audiences 15 and over".

The film became commercially successful beyond expectations, grossing over ₩130 billion with a ₩10.5 billion budget, and was dubbed as the highest performing South Korean film since COVID-19 pandemic. It opened with a record of 467,525 admissions, the highest opening for a film released in South Korea in the last 882 days since Ashfall (2019). It registered 10 million viewers on 25th day, becoming the first film of the year 2022 and first Korean film since Parasite (2019) to achieve the feat. Surpassing US$100 million gross and 12.6 million admissions, The Roundup became 9th most-viewed and 3rd highsest-grossing South Korean film in the history.

The Roundup: No Way Out 

Ma Seok-do teams up with the Regional Investigation Unit, to chase down Joo Seong-cheol and the Japanese gangsters from committing heinous crimes in Korea.

The Roundup: Punishment 
Ma Seok-do joins the Cyber Investigation Team to catch Baek Chang-ghi, a former mercenary and the leader of the most notorious illegal online gambling organization.

Future 
A fourth film, produced by B.A. Entertainment and distributed by ABO Entertainment, is being planned with the goal of starting production after the third film ends filming. In May 2022, at a press event for The Roundup, Ma Dong-seok introduced Crime City as a Korean franchise that will be produced as a series of eight films. In July, in an interview with Deadline, he revealed that apart from the eight films, two additional spinoffs have been suggested, hence Crime City, in a way, would be akin to Universal’s Fast & Furious franchise.

References 

Film series introduced in 2017
South Korean film series
South Korean crime action films
South Korean gangster films
South Korean police films
South Korean sequel films